The 1999 Kremlin Cup women's doubles was the women's doubles event of the fourth WTA edition of the Kremlin Cup; a WTA Tier I tournament and the most prestigious tournament held in Russia. Mary Pierce and Natasha Zvereva were the defending champions, but Pierce competed this year with Barbara Schett, whereas Zvereva competed with Elena Tatarkova.

Pierce and Schett withdrew after their first round victory, whereas Zvereva and Tatarkova were defeated in the semifinals by eventual champions Lisa Raymond and Rennae Stubbs.

Seeds

Draw

Draw

Qualifying

Seeds

Qualifiers
 ''' Sarah Pitkowski /  Ekaterina Sysoeva

Qualifying draw

References

External links
Draw

Kremlin Cup
Kremlin Cup